Jacqueline Starer was born in Paris in 1940. After studying French and Classics at the Sorbonne, she met the English Poet Keith Barnes (1934–1969) in Paris in 1963. Together they left for the United States where she taught in several Universities and Colleges (University of California, Berkeley, Bard College, N.Y.) and where she discovered American Poetry. After Keith Barnes's death in Paris, she returned to the United States where she wrote her thesis on the writers of the Beat Generation (directed by Roger Asselineau at the Sorbonne). In 1976, she is back in Paris, and becomes involved in International Cooperation in Cultural Affairs. She translated the whole poetic work of Keith Barnes into French as well, with Michèle Duclos, as a choice of poems of the Japanese poet Shizue Ogawa. She was Representative for Le Journal des Poètes (Brussels) in France (2006–2012). She is the author of five books: on writers of the Beat Generation, on Keith Barnes, and on the life of French people in the Paris area at the end of the 20th century.

Bibliography 
Les Écrivains beats et  le voyage and Chronologie des écrivains beats jusqu’en 1969, (checked by Carolyn Cassady, Gregory Corso, Lawrence Ferlinghetti, Allen Ginsberg, Eileen Kaufman and Gary Snyder), Marcel Didier, Paris, 1977
K.B. (with a selection of poems by Keith Barnes translated into French), éditions Maurice Nadeau, Paris, 1987
Les Bougons, La Bartavelle (Collection romans et prose), 2002
Keith Barnes Œuvre poétique Collected Poems, opening by Maurice Nadeau, éditions d’écarts, Paris, 2003
K.B. KEITH BARNES, bilingual edition, English Translation by Helen McPhail, éditions d’écarts, Dol-de-Bretagne, 2007.
Translation from the English, with Michèle Duclos, of Une Âme qui joue, Choix de poèmes by Shizue Ogawa, éditions de la Maison Internationale de Poésie – Arthur Haulot, Bruxelles, 2010, Prix international de poésie Antonio Viccaro 2010
Les Écrivains de la Beat Generation (including the Chronologie jusqu’en 1969), éditions d’écarts, F-35120 Dol de Bretagne, 2011

References

External links
 Keith Barnes site run by Starer

Living people
French translators
1940 births